Barend de Vries (1925–2010) was Chief Economist at the World Bank.

Barend was born in Utrecht, the Netherlands and was brought up as a member of the Dutch Reformed Church. In 1943, whilst a student at the University of Utrecht he was arrested and sent to a concentration camp, as the occupying Nazis wished to make an example of some students following the killing of a Dutch Nazi general. However after the war he was able to finish his degree and proceed to post graduate education at the University of Chicago finally gaining a PhD at Massachusetts Institute of Technology. He also participated in the Cowles Commission whilst at Chicago.

He was married to Margaret Garritsen de Vries.

References

1925 births
2010 deaths
Dutch economists
World Bank Chief Economists
Utrecht University alumni
De Vries, Barend
De Vries, Barend
Businesspeople from Utrecht (city)
Dutch officials of the United Nations